Harry Warren (1893–1981) was an American composer and lyricist.

Harry Warren may also refer to:

Harry Warren (footballer), British footballer and football manager
Harry J. Warren (born 1950), North Carolina representative (Republican)
Harry Marsh Warren (1861–1940), American Baptist minister

See also
Henry Warren (disambiguation)
Harold Warren (born 1960), an American professional boxer
Harold P. Warren, businessman and filmmaker, director of Manos: The Hands of Fate
Warren Harry (1953–2008), British songwriter and performer